Albert Richard Caputo (May 22, 1938 – March 11, 2020)  was a United States district judge of the United States District Court for the Middle District of Pennsylvania.

Education and career

Born in Port Chester, New York, Caputo received an Artium Baccalaureus degree from Brown University in 1960 and a Bachelor of Laws from the University of Pennsylvania Law School in 1963. He was in private practice in Wilkes-Barre, Pennsylvania from 1963 to 1964, and in the United States Air Force JAG Corps from 1964 to 1967. He was an assistant public defender in Luzerne County, Pennsylvania in 1968, returning to private practice in Kingston, Pennsylvania from 1968 to 1997.

Federal judicial service

On July 31, 1997, Caputo was nominated by President Bill Clinton to a seat on the United States District Court for the Middle District of Pennsylvania vacated by Richard Paul Conaboy. Caputo was confirmed by the United States Senate on November 9, 1997, and received his commission on November 12, 1997. He assumed senior status on March 31, 2009. He died on March 11, 2020, aged 81.

References

Sources 

1938 births
2020 deaths
20th-century American judges
20th-century American lawyers
21st-century American judges
American people of Italian descent
Brown University alumni
Judges of the United States District Court for the Middle District of Pennsylvania
Military personnel from New York (state)
Pennsylvania lawyers
People from Port Chester, New York
People from Wilkes-Barre, Pennsylvania
Public defenders
United States Air Force officers
United States district court judges appointed by Bill Clinton
University of Pennsylvania Law School alumni